Kaloran Firiam (born 10 December 1994) is a Vanuatuan footballer who plays as a goalkeeper for Malampa Revivors F.C. and the Vanuatu national football team.

References

External links

Fiji Football Association profile

1994 births
Living people
Vanuatuan footballers
Vanuatu international footballers
Association football goalkeepers
Nalkutan F.C. players
2016 OFC Nations Cup players